The Scots College is a multi-campus independent Presbyterian single-sex primary and secondary day and boarding school for boys, predominantly located in , an eastern suburb of Sydney, New South Wales, Australia.

Students attend Scots from all regions of the greater metropolitan area and New South Wales country regions.

The college is affiliated with the Association of Heads of Independent Schools of Australia (AHISA), the Junior School Heads Association of Australia (JSHAA), the Australian Boarding Schools' Association (ABSA), the Headmasters' and Headmistresses' Conference, and is a founding member of the Athletic Association of the Great Public Schools of New South Wales (AAGPS).

History 
The college was formed in 1893 by three men, Archibald Gilchrist, William "Fighting Mac" Dill-Macky, and Arthur Aspinall. Gilchrist devised the school motto of "Utinam Patribus Nostris Digni Simus", which may be translated from Latin as "O that we may be worthy of our forefathers".

Arthur Aspinall, who became the first Principal, was minister to the Forbes parish from 1874 to 1887. An educated man himself, with a love of learning, he saw the need to educate the sons of the pastoralists of the area. His dream was for a boarding school in Sydney to which these very isolated farming families could send their children. Lillyan MacDonald of the Church Records and Historical Society (Uniting Church in Australia, NSW Synod) writes: 

The Presbyterian Church was not happy with the proposal to start the school. Aspinall became the guarantor, advancing the capital required, while the possibility of starting the school was still a matter of bitter contention within the Church hierarchy. Thus Scots opened as a private enterprise. Once the school was established and functioning, the Church Assembly saw no reason to continue to oppose the idea of the school. In 1906 Aspinall sold the college to the Church for 7,000 pounds and so it became part of the Presbyterian education system in New South Wales.

Original campus at Lady Robinson Beach 
The college was originally established at Lady Robinson Beach, now renamed Brighton-Le-Sands, near the shores of Botany Bay. The initial school building was the modified, de-licensed New Brighton Hotel on The Grand Parade, near Bay Street. The renovations to the hotel were done by Arthur Aspinall's brother, Albert Aspinall. The first Principal, the Rev Arthur Aspinall, remained in this position until his retirement in 1913. The school was officially opened 28 January 1893 by the Governor of New South Wales, the Right Honourable Victor Albert George, Earl of Jersey. Villiers Street, Rockdale was named in honour of this occasion. There were ten-day students and 25 Boarders.

The period when the school opened was a time of depression. The first few years for the school were difficult. There were 55 boys enrolled at the school when, in 1895, (soon after a racecourse had opened nearby) the school moved to its current location in Bellevue Hill.

Early days at Bellevue Hill 
The school occupied St Killians, the former home of Judge Josephson. Before he retired, Aspinall had added new buildings to the school and developed playing fields. The school was still surrounded by many areas of bushland which caught fire on hot summer days. Lessons would be cancelled so that the students could assist in the fire fighting. Aspinall was a stern Principal who dealt harshly with misdemeanours. Often his acerbic tongue and brilliant use of words produced ridicule more intimidating than any of his physical punishments. But he was also capable of empathy. Some promising students were educated for free when economic constraints within a family seemed likely to result in a student being withdrawn from the school.

1914 to 1955 
James Bee, a New Zealander, continued the growth and expansion of the college. When he retired in 1934 there were 450 enrolled students. Alexander Knox Anderson, also a New Zealander, saw the Depression end only to be followed four years later by World War II. During World War II, Scots and its student body relocated to a purpose built campus at Bathurst, to the west of the Great Dividing Range. This was due to the proximity of the Bellevue Hill campus to the coast, and the fear of Japanese naval bombardment, a fear justified in May 1942 with the Japanese mini-sub attack on Sydney Harbour.

The Bathurst campus remained part of the school for a short period after the war, before splintering off and becoming the independent The Scots School, Bathurst.

1968 
The 75th Anniversary celebrations were held 3 to 10 May. The 1200 students at the college and past students had much to celebrate, for many former students had achieved success. In 1968 Robert Naumann was Professor of Nuclear Physics at Princeton University in the United States of America. The Guest of Honour at the celebrations, the oldest known student in 1968, was Ed Spark, a dental surgeon who had attended the school in 1894 at Lady Robinson Beach.

Subsequent history 
In 1975, a fire gutted the school's Assembly Hall, resulting in a major reconstruction and renovation of school facilities. The fire was deemed to be caused by an "electrical fault" but the word at the time was that it was caused by students playing with fireworks on the stage. A small rocket was set off and got stuck high up in the curtain, where the exhaust and or the exploding head, set fire to it.
The fire spread rapidly over the curtain and up into the roof. Fortunately, no one was killed or injured. 

In 1988, the school opened its outdoor education campus, "Glengarry", in the Kangaroo Valley. Attending Glengarry is compulsory for all Year 9 boys, who live on site in one of five dormitories for six months. A residential academic and outdoor education team deliver a wide range of carefully developed personal development programs that enhance academic motivation and learning, and emphasise discipline, care, respect and curiosity. The year group is split into two intakes, they attend in terms 1 and 2, and terms 3 and 4 respectively. The Glengarry adventure now finishes with a 'Long Journey Home', which involves the intake to ride, hike and canoe their way back to Sydney from Glengarry.

Most of the Council members are elected by the General Assembly of the Presbyterian Church of Australia in New South Wales.

In August 2017, the school was forced to cancel the HSC Trial Physics exam as two CSSA papers were stolen in a late night heist. The culprits are yet to be discovered. A discussion into the event was had on the HSC Discussion Group 2017 Facebook page, under the thread by Joe Connell; a friend of the physics department. That year a number of students were also suspended from the school following unsanctioned "muck-up" day activities.

In March 2018 The Scots College celebrated 125 years of boys' education and opened a new campus, Brighton Preparatory School at Dolls Point, near its original site at Brighton-Le-Sands.

Principals 
The following individuals have served as Principal of The Scots College:

Facilities 
The Scots College has four campuses: Bellevue Hill, Mansion Road, Brighton (Brighton Le Sands), Glengarry (Kangaroo Valley), Bannockburn (Shoalhaven River).

Oval houses the Year 12/11 Study Area, the Black Watch Café, the Privy Council Rooms, The College Shop, and the school's two main function rooms (the Founders' Room). Scots main houses the Auditorium and main school administration, whilst the Centenary Centre contains the school's primary Lecture room, the Coote Theatre and various music facilities and musical instruments.

The college quadrangle finished reconstruction in 2007 to provide additional change rooms and wheelchair accessible facilities such as an elevator for the Main Building, as well as vastly improving the aesthetics of the College 'quad'.

A new Mathematics/Science building named the Graeme Clark Centre, as well as aerobics room (Bottom Level – the same level as the current pool and weights room) was constructed from early 2007 to late 2008. Classes began on Monday 17 November 2008 and the building was opened on Friday 27 March 2009.

In 2007 the new 'Ginahgulla' classrooms were completed. These classrooms house years five and six located at the Senior campus, Victoria Rd. The upper floors were renovated in 2008 and became new Languages and English classrooms.

The college was able to fund an altitude training chamber in the high-performance center. Such a device is able to alter the levels of oxygen present during sport training sessions and PD lessons. While providing benefit to the college's leading athletes, the benefit of such equipment for the institution as a whole has been publicly questioned.

Pipes and drums 
As a testament to its Scottish heritage, the school has a very well known pipe band: The Scots College Pipes and Drums, established in 1900. The original band consisted of five members – boys who had joined the cadets as pipers. There are now over 230 boys in the band, making it the largest in the Southern Hemisphere. In 1931 the band was granted permission to wear the tartan of the Black Watch regiment. The band's royal patron was formerly the Queen Mother. Traditionally, the Scots Pipes and Drums leads the annual ANZAC Day parade through Sydney. At the 2006 Australian Pipe band Championships, the Drum Corps won the Juvenile Drum Corp title, and the band as a whole earned a respectable third place. These results were then followed up by a successful run at the 2008 Australian Pipe Band Championships, where the band won both the Juvenile and Grade 4 title. These are the best results the band has seen in its long and prosperous history. The Pipes and Drums was recently invited and participated in the 2012 Queen's Diamond Jubilee Royal Edinburgh Military Tattoo, the 2014 Basel Tattoo and went back to Edinburgh in 2016 to participate again in the Royal Edinburgh Tattoo
.

Sport 

Sport has traditionally played a large role in the college and is an important part of the curriculum. The college competes in the AAGPS competition and has had notable success across a number of sports. Students must play at least one sport in summer and one in winter.

One of the most participated and prestigious sports in the School is Rugby Union however basketball is not far behind. In some years the opens ages bracket has reached down to ten XVs teams. Winning in a total of 11 1st XV premierships in the AAGPS competition, which is the 4th the highest amount of premierships attained out of all the GPS schools.

House system 
Like most Australian schools, The Scots College uses a house system. Scots has 13 student houses, of which 5 are boarding houses. Each year the houses participate in multiple academic and sporting competitions, spread across the school year, and are awarded points according to their placings. This point system determines the winner of the House Championship each year (announced at a final assembly). The day boy houses contain between 90 and 95 students each, whilst the boarding houses have between 50 and 65.

The school's thirteen houses are as follows:

Notable alumni 

Former students of The Scots College are known as Old Boys, or alternatively Old Scotsmen, and may elect to join the school's alumni association, The Scots College Old Boys' Union (OBU). The OBU was formed in 1900, and today supports the school with financial assistance, while working to facilitate communication and interaction between the College and its Old Boys through events and activities, such as alumni and sporting reunions. Reunions are also held in various states of Australia and overseas.

Business 
Harry Triguboff property developer and billionaire
David Lee Freedmanracehorse trainer
Albert Edward Harris company director; Chairman of the Australian Radio Network
Ezra Nortonnewspaper proprietor (also attended Waverley College)
Thomas Gregory Parry Chairman of Sydney Water Corporation; Foundation Chairman of the Independent Pricing and Regulatory Tribunal of New South Wales

Academia, public service, politics and religious service

 Graeme Milbourne Clark pioneer of the multiple-channel cochlear implant
 Charlie Teo neurosurgeon
 The Hon Peter McCallum Dowding former Premier of Western Australia
 Peter Jensenformer Anglican Archbishop of Sydney
 Rear Admiral Sir David James Martin former Governor of New South Wales
 Andrew Hastiecurrent Federal Member for Canning

Sport
 Ben Bryantcricketer
 Angus Crichtonrugby league player for the Sydney Roosters
 Andrew EdmondsonAustralian wheelchair rugby player
 Tim Gavinrugby union player for the Eastern Suburbs RUFC, Waratahs, and Wallabies
 Jack Maddocksrugby union player for the Waratahs (rugby union) and Wallabies
 Andrew Kellawayrugby union player as an Australian schoolboy and NEC Green Rockets, now playing for Wallabies
Toby Rudolf - rugby league player for the Cronulla-Sutherland Sharks
 Colin Scotts - Australian schoolboy rugby union and NFL player St Louis Cardinals.
Mitch Short - rugby union player for the New South Wales Waratahs
Billy Smith (rugby league, born 1999) - rugby league player for the Sydney Roosters
 Thomas Whalanfour-time Olympian water polo player
 Will Harris (rugby union) - Rugby Union Player for NSW Waratahs
 Siua Wong - Rugby league player for Sydney Roosters and Fijian rugby league team
 David Horwitz (rugby union) Former rugby union player as an Australian schoolboy, Australian Under 20s, NSW Waratahs and Connacht Rugby. First player of Jewish faith to play Super Rugby.
 James Matheson (skier). Australian freestyle moguls skier. Competed at the Winter Olympics PyeongChang 2018 and Beijing 2022.

Gallery

See also 

 List of non-government schools in New South Wales
 List of boarding schools in Australia
 History of Brighton-Le-Sands, New South Wales
 List of pipe bands
 Lawrence Campbell Oratory Competition
 Scottish Australians
 Ginahgulla

References

Further reading

External links
 The Scots College website

Educational institutions established in 1893
Presbyterian schools in Australia
Boarding schools in New South Wales
Private primary schools in Sydney
Private secondary schools in Sydney
Member schools of the Headmasters' and Headmistresses' Conference
Boys' schools in New South Wales
Junior School Heads Association of Australia Member Schools
Scottish-Australian culture
1893 establishments in Australia
Bellevue Hill, New South Wales
Athletic Association of the Great Public Schools of New South Wales